Vaudesincourt is a commune in the Marne department in north-eastern France.

Geography
The commune is traversed by the Suippe river.

See also
Communes of the Marne department

References

Communes of Marne (department)